Victor-Lévy Beaulieu (born September 2, 1945 in Saint-Paul-de-la-Croix, Quebec) is a French Canadian writer, playwright and editor.

Born in Saint-Paul-de-la-Croix, in the area of Bas-Saint-Laurent, Victor-Lévy Beaulieu began primary school at Trois-Pistoles, moving later to Montréal-Nord.

He began his public writing career at the Montreal weekly Perspectives, where he served as chronicler for a decade (1966–1976). In 1967, he became a copy writer at La Presse, Petit Journal, Digest Éclair, and finally at Maintenant in 1970.

In 1967 he won the Larousse-Hachette Prize thanks to an eighteen-page essay devoted to Victor Hugo.  In 1968, he spent a year in Paris, and on his return became a scriptwriter at the Montreal radio station CKLM while resuming his position of chronicler.  Also in 1968, he published his first novel Mémoires d'outre-tonneau.  This would be the first of a long run: Race de monde (1969) — La nuite de Malcomm Hudd (1969) — Jos Connaissant (1970) — Les Grands Pères (1971) — Un rêve québécois (1972) — Oh Miami Miami Miami (1973) — Don Quichotte de la démanche (1974).

Beaulieu served as a teacher of literature at the National Theatre School of Canada from 1972 to 1978, and also wrote for the Radio-Canada broadcasts "Documents", "Petit théâtre", "Roman", "La Feuillaison".

His recent book, James Joyce, l'Irlande et le Québec, has been praised by critics.

In 2008 he threatened to burn copies of his entire body of work as a protest against the growth of bilingualism in Quebec and various statements by PQ leader Pauline Marois in support of English classes for francophone schoolchildren.

The writer created a stir after describing Canadian Governor-General Michaëlle Jean as a "negro queen" in L'Aut'Journal magazine.  Beaulieu said Ms. Jean was appointed to the post because she was "black, young, pretty, ambitious, and because of her husband, certainly a nationalist as well."  In an interview with La Presse, the author defended his text, saying he had not intended to be racist. However, his eight references to the "reine negre" caught the attention of Bloc Québécois Leader Gilles Duceppe and Bloc MP Vivian Barbot.  Ms. Barbot told La Presse she found the text insulting and discriminatory, as well as a personal attack on Ms. Jean's character.

Mr. Beaulieu wrote of the "small, black queen of Radio-Canada" and her visit to France, where she spoke about Canadian federalism, but also saluted France for its abolition of slavery in 1847. Mr. Beaulieu noted Ms. Jean, a native of Haiti, came from a country that long suffered the effects of slavery.

He also attacked writer Mordecai Richler for the unsympathetic portrayal of French Canadians in his novels.

References

1945 births
Writers from Quebec
Canadian non-fiction writers in French
Living people
Canadian dramatists and playwrights in French
Prix Athanase-David winners
Governor General's Award-winning fiction writers
Quebec sovereigntists
People from Bas-Saint-Laurent
Rhinoceros Party of Canada candidates in the 1979 Canadian federal election
Quebec candidates for Member of Parliament
Independent candidates in Quebec provincial elections
20th-century Canadian dramatists and playwrights
20th-century Canadian non-fiction writers
21st-century Canadian non-fiction writers
Canadian male dramatists and playwrights
Canadian male non-fiction writers